Fort Worth Spinks Airport  is a city-owned, public-use airport located 14 nautical miles (26 km) south of the central business district of Fort Worth, in Tarrant County, Texas, United States. It is the newest of the three airports that are owned by the City of Fort Worth and it serves the cities of Fort Worth, Burleson, and Mansfield. The airport is located at the intersection of Interstate 35W and HWY 1187 and serves as a reliever airport for Fort Worth Meacham International Airport and Dallas–Fort Worth International Airport and has Class D designation.

Although most U.S. airports use the same three-letter location identifier for the FAA and IATA, this airport is assigned FWS by the FAA but has no designation from the IATA.

History 
Spinks Airport was named for Maurice Hunter "Pappy" Spinks, a renowned aerobatic competitor/promoter and aviation manufacturer who built the nearby Oak Grove Airport, portions of which have been encompassed by Spinks Airport.  Pappy was a patron of the Aerobatic Club of America and was described by fellow aerobatic pilots as a "rough edged old millionaire", who had made a fortune during the Vietnam War as a vendor for nearby Bell Helicopter. On May 28, 1989 Oak Grove airport was closed and Spinks Airport was opened.

Facilities and aircraft 
It has two runways: 18R/36L is 6,002 by 100 feet (1,829 x 30 m) with an asphalt surface; 18L/36R is 3,660 by 60 feet (1,116 x 18 m) with a turf surface.

The fixed-base operator (Harrison Aviation) has constructed a  terminal building that houses their operations and the offices of the airport manager.

For the 12-month period ending September 30, 2008, the airport had 82,948 aircraft operations, an average of 227 per day: 99.4% general aviation, 0.4% air taxi, and 0.3% military. At that time there were 199 aircraft based at this airport: 78% single-engine, 18% multi-engine, 3% jet and 1% helicopter.

References

External links 
 Honored in 2007 as most improved airport in Texas
 Harrison Aviation - FBO
 Texas Gyro - Avionics and Instruments
 Spinks Flight Center
 Air Methods - Pediatric Transport for Cook Children's Hospital
 CAM Aircraft Maintenance - Certified Aircraft Maintenance for all GA Aircraft 
 Aerial photo as of 19 January 1995 from USGS The National Map
 

Airports in Fort Worth, Texas
Airports in Tarrant County, Texas